Indianapolis  Veterans Administration Hospital, also known as Larue D. Carter Memorial Hospital is a historic hospital complex and national historic district located at Indianapolis, Indiana.  The district resources were developed between 1930 and 1951 by the Veterans Administration, and encompasses 15 contributing buildings, 2 contributing sites, 2 contributing structures and 5 contributing objects on the hospital campus.  The main complex is connected by an enclosed corridor and consists of the main hospital building (1931), kitchen/mess hall/boiler house/attendants' quarters, general medical building (1939), and recreation building (1941).  The buildings reflect the Colonial Revival and Classical Revival styles of architecture.

The name of doctor Larue D. Carter had previously been attached to the state's first intensive-treatment psychiatric  hospital, a facility within a large assembly of buildings (which then also included both the Indiana University Indianapolis campus and the V.A. Hospital), in recognition of his leadership role in the state's Mental Health Association, at a time   when the Civil War-era Central State Hospital psychiatric facility, in the same city, was being pilloried as an obsolete relic reflecting inhumane approaches to mental illness.

This V.A. facility was listed on the National Register of Historic Places in 2012.

References

Historic districts on the National Register of Historic Places in Indiana
Hospital buildings on the National Register of Historic Places in Indiana
Colonial Revival architecture in Indiana
Neoclassical architecture in Indiana
Historic districts in Indianapolis
National Register of Historic Places in Indianapolis